Gary Hoffman is an American former gridiron football player and coach. He served as the interim head coach of the Winnipeg Blue Bombers of the Canadian Football League in 1998 He also served as the head football coach at Sioux Falls College from 1973 to 1975, compiling a record of 11–17. Hoffman retired from coach in 2004.

Head coaching record

College

References

Year of birth missing (living people)
Living people
Augustana (South Dakota) Vikings football coaches
Saskatchewan Roughriders  coaches
Sioux Falls Cougars football coaches
South Dakota State Jackrabbits football coaches
Winnipeg Blue Bombers coaches
High school football coaches in Iowa
High school football coaches in Minnesota
High school football coaches in South Dakota